Qurmish (also Romanized as Qūrmīsh and Qowrmīsh; also known as Gharmish, Kurmish, and Qormīsh) is a village in Behi Dehbokri Rural District, Simmineh District, Bukan County, West Azerbaijan Province, Iran. At the 2006 census, its population was 178, in 35 families.

References 

Populated places in Bukan County